Leevi Viitala (born 20 June 2001) is a Finnish ice hockey player who plays for Porin Ässät in Liiga. Viitala has also played Finnish baseball for 10 years in Kankaanpään Maila and Pomarkun Pyry.

Career 
Leevi Viitala made his Liiga debut with Ässät in 2020. He played 12 games and put up 5 points.

In 2021 Viitala made an extension contranct with Ässät.

References 

Living people
2001 births
Finnish ice hockey forwards
Ässät players
People from Pomarkku
Sportspeople from Satakunta